A superteam in the National Basketball Association (NBA) is a team that is viewed as significantly more talented than the rest of the teams in the league. There is no official distinction, but it is generally viewed as a team that has at least 3 Hall of Fame, All-Star, or All-NBA caliber players that join forces to pursue an NBA Championship. The most well-known examples of superteams are the "Big Three" of the Miami Heat and the "Hamptons Five" of the Golden State Warriors.

Definition 
There is no exact definition of an NBA superteam, and NBA fans disagree on what constitutes a superteam. Some NBA fans define superteams by the talent on the roster, while others define them by the playoff success they have. The origin of superteams is also debated. Some NBA fans view superteams as a relatively new concept that started with the 2008 Celtics and the “Heatles”. Others contend that superteams have always existed in the NBA, dating back to Bill Russell's Celtics and the 1969 Los Angeles Lakers with Wilt Chamberlain, Jerry West, and Elgin Baylor.

The general conception of a superteam is a team with at least 3 perennial All-Stars that joins the team through free agency or trades rather than the NBA draft. Examples of this are the 2007–2012 Boston Celtics (Paul Pierce, Kevin Garnett, and Ray Allen) and the 2010–2014 Heat (LeBron James, Dwyane Wade, and Chris Bosh). Some fans classify any “big three” of perennial All-Stars as a superteam even if the team was built primarily through the draft. This would include the 1995-1998 Chicago Bulls (Michael Jordan, Scottie Pippen, and Dennis Rodman) and the 1980s Celtics (Larry Bird, Kevin McHale, and Robert Parish). Another conception is when an MVP-caliber player joins a team that is already a legitimate title contender. Examples of this are Moses Malone joining the Philadelphia 76ers in 1982 and Kevin Durant joining the Golden State Warriors in 2016. A broader conception is any team that wins multiple championships with a noticeably more talented roster than the rest of the league. Examples of this are the Showtime Lakers and the 2000s Lakers led by Shaquille O’Neal and Kobe Bryant.

It is also debated if "failed superteams" should truly be classified as superteams. A failed superteam is essentially an attempt to unite perennial All-Stars that doesn't result in a championship. Injuries and clashing teammates are the primary reasons these teams fail to live up to expectations. Examples of this are the 1996-1999 Houston Rockets (Hakeem Olajuwon, Charles Barkley, and Clyde Drexler who was later replaced by Scottie Pippen), the 2013 Lakers (Kobe Bryant, Pau Gasol, Steve Nash, and Dwight Howard), and the 2021 Brooklyn Nets (Kevin Durant, Kyrie Irving, and James Harden).

Notable Superteams

1982–1986: Philadelphia 76ers

On September 15, 1982, restricted free agent Moses Malone was acquired by the Philadelphia 76ers in a sign-and-trade with the Houston Rockets for Caldwell Jones and a 1983 1st round draft pick (Rodney McCray was later selected). The 76ers achieved a 65–17 record, made it to the NBA Finals and swept the defending champions Los Angeles Lakers. The following season, the 76ers had a 52–30 record and were upset in the First Round by the New Jersey Nets. In the 1984 NBA draft, the 76ers drafted Charles Barkley with the 5th overall pick. With the inclusion of Barkley, the 76ers improved to a 58–24 record compared to the previous season. They made it to the Conference Finals where they were eliminated by the defending champions Boston Celtics in 5 games. The Celtics went on to get eliminated in the NBA Finals in 6 games against the Los Angeles Lakers. The following season, the 76ers had a 54–28 record and were eliminated in the Conference Semifinals by the Milwaukee Bucks in 7 games. In the offseason, the 76ers traded Moses Malone along with Terry Catledge, a 1986 1st round draft pick (Anthony Jones was later selected), and a 1988 1st round draft pick (Harvey Grant was later selected) to the Washington Bullets for Cliff Robinson and Jeff Ruland, ending the superteam era of the Philadelphia 76ers.

2007–2012: Boston Celtics

Following a lackluster 2006–2007 season, finishing 24–58, the Celtics sought a new move to propel them to the top of the league. Following the end of the season, during the summer of 2007, Danny Ainge made a blockbuster move. "On draft night, he traded No. 5 pick Jeff Green, Wally Szczerbiak and Delonte West to Seattle for perennial all-star Ray Allen and Seattle's second-round pick (which the team used to select LSU's Glen "Big Baby" Davis). The Celtics then traded Ryan Gomes, Gerald Green, Al Jefferson, Theo Ratliff, Sebastian Telfair, and a first-round draft pick to the Timberwolves in exchange for superstar power forward Kevin Garnett. These moves created a new "Big Three" of Pierce, Allen, and Garnett." This new "Big Three" created the most drastic record changes in NBA history seeing them finish 66-16 for the season en route to the 2008 NBA Championship.

2010–2014: Miami Heat

In the 2010 offseason, LeBron James entered free agency with free choice of his next team. He had just come off one of the best statistical seasons of his career, been voted All-Star six times, and won back-to-back MVP awards with the Cleveland Cavaliers. Although there was much speculation and hype surrounding James and his choice, it was kept hidden for many weeks until he announced his plans on a live ESPN broadcast, The Decision. He chose to join the Miami Heat and fellow draft class member and good friend, Dwyane Wade.

Wade had already proven himself a superstar with the Miami Heat where he won the 2006 NBA Championship and Finals MVP. His other achievements included 6-time All-Star, 5-time All-NBA teamer, 2009 scoring champion, and 2010 All-Star MVP. Chris Bosh, another member of their draft class, would also join James and Wade, then a 5-time All-Star and franchise all-time leader in points, rebounds, blocks, and minutes played at the time he left the Toronto Raptors.

The Heat made 4 straight NBA Finals from 2011–2014. They lost the 2011 NBA Finals to the Dallas Mavericks before winning two straight over the Oklahoma City Thunder and the San Antonio Spurs respectively. During this time, they made NBA history with such feats as 27 straight victories from February 3 to March 25, 2013, the second-longest win streak in NBA history, as well as only the second time that three teammates had each scored 30 points and grabbed 10 rebounds in a regulation match, which had last happened over 50 years prior.

In the 2014 Finals, the Heat lost to the Spurs in 5 games in a rematch of the previous Finals. Following the loss, LeBron James reentered free agency and returned to his hometown team, the Cleveland Cavaliers, thus ending the run of the Miami Big Three.

Many other players and franchises would follow in the footsteps of the Big Three by joining other superstar players to form their own superteam in a quest to win a championship. However, it would be LeBron James himself who formed the next "big three" of the league, joining forces with Kyrie Irving and Kevin Love.

2016–2019: Golden State Warriors

In the 2016 offseason, after blowing a 3–1 lead to the Cavaliers in the 2016 Finals, the Warriors made a move to re-assert their spot as the most dominant franchise in the league by acquiring Kevin Durant in free agency. Durant had been a member of the Oklahoma City Thunder and was part of the team that had led the Warriors 3–1 in the Western Conference Finals, but then blew the lead and missed out on their first conference championship since 2012. Durant joined the Warriors highly decorated and as one of the best players in the league with a resume of 2014 MVP, four-time NBA Scoring champion, seven-time All-Star, 2012 All-Star MVP, and six-time All-NBA teamer.

Before the playoffs, the Warriors had matched or broken several NBA records. They reclaimed the top seed with 67 wins along, won the most ever games by a 40-point-plus margin, and extended their run of most games without back-to-back losses in the regular season to 146 (spanning from April 9, 2015, to March 2, 2017). They tied the record for most players in the All-Star game with 4 (Durant, Stephen Curry, Klay Thompson, and Draymond Green).

In the postseason, the Warriors broke the records for best start (15–0), longest win streak (15), and best overall record (16–1). They swept the Western Conference Playoffs 12–0 before eliminating the Cavaliers in the Finals in 5 games.

In 2018, the Warriors were unable to reclaim the league's best record after 3 straight years of doing so. They eliminated the San Antonio Spurs and the New Orleans Pelicans each in 5 games before narrowly beating the 1st-seeded Houston Rockets in 7 games in the Western Conference Finals. They swept the 2018 Finals over Cleveland to win a second straight title, and 3 titles in 4 years.

In the 2018 offseason, the Warriors signed DeMarcus Cousins as a free agent. Although he was injured then, he was still considered a dominant "big man" with great skill and defensive tenacity, which had won him two All-NBA selections and four All-Star games before the signing. The Warriors became the first franchise in 42 years to be able to start five All-Stars (as they had all been the previous year), one in each floor position.

The Warriors reclaimed the 1st seed in the Western Conference with a 57–25 record and made it to their 5th straight NBA Finals. However, they lost the 2019 Finals in 6 games to the Toronto Raptors (led by Kawhi Leonard). The Warriors were plagued by injuries, with Kevin Durant missing playoff games with a calf injury and an Achilles tear, and Klay Thompson suffering hamstring and ACL injuries in the Finals. In the 2019 offseason, Durant joined the Brooklyn Nets in a sign-and-trade deal, officially ending the superteam era of the Warriors.

Notable Failed Superteams

1996–1997: Houston Rockets

On August 19, 1996, NBA superstar Charles Barkley was traded by the Phoenix Suns to the Rockets for Chucky Brown, Mark Bryant, Sam Cassell, and Robert Horry. This trade formed a superteam of Hakeem Olajuwon, Charles Barkley, and Clyde Drexler. The Rockets achieved a 57–25 record, made it to the Western Conference Finals and lost to the Utah Jazz in 6 games.

2012–2013: Los Angeles Lakers

On July 11, 2012, Steve Nash was traded by the Phoenix Suns to the Lakers. On August 10, 2012, NBA superstar Dwight Howard was traded by the Orlando Magic to the Lakers in a 4-team trade. This trade formed a superteam of Kobe Bryant, Dwight Howard, Steve Nash, and Pau Gasol. The Lakers dealt with injuries, with Gasol only playing 49 games due to a foot injury and Steve Nash only playing 50 games due to a leg injury. On April 12, 2013, Kobe Bryant tore his achilles in a game against the Warriors. Due to the injuries, the Lakers finished with a 45–37 record and were swept in the First Round by the Spurs.

2020–2023: Brooklyn Nets

Near the start of the 2020–21 season, on January 13, 2021, the Brooklyn Nets traded for James Harden in a blockbuster four-team trade, which reunited Harden with his Oklahoma City Thunder teammate Kevin Durant, and also gave him All-Star Kyrie Irving to form a new superteam in the East. However, this team struggled due to various injuries to Durant, Harden, and Irving, and were eliminated by the eventual champion Milwaukee Bucks in Game 7 in overtime of the Eastern Conference Semifinals. Harden was ultimately traded to the 76ers in the following season for a package headlined by All-Star Ben Simmons. With Simmons sitting out of the season due to struggles with mental health, the Irving and Durant led team finished 7th in the conference, surviving the Play-In Tournament against the Cavaliers before being swept by the eventual Conference champion Celtics in the first round. In 2023, Irving requested a trade from the Nets and was traded to the Dallas Mavericks. Following Irving's trade to the Mavericks, Durant was subsequently traded to the Phoenix Suns.

Controversy
There has been some controversy about superteams in the NBA. Claims persist that superstar players are no longer looking to make the game competitive, but rather finding an easier way to win championships and nullifying smaller contenders by joining other elites. From James joining the Heat to Durant joining the Warriors, there has been derision from the media and fans in their efforts to unbalance the NBA. However, there have been cases for both sides as others argue that the NBA has achieved its highest grossing TV revenue, that it was all done under the rules of the salary cap, and that it is enjoyable sports entertainment.

See also
 Supergroup (music)

References

National Basketball Association players
National Basketball Association teams